Nakomiady  is a village in the administrative district of Gmina Kętrzyn, within Kętrzyn County, Warmian-Masurian Voivodeship, in northern Poland.

The village has a population of 670.

History
A castle was built by the Teutonic Knight Konrad von Kyburg between 1392 and 1396, this castle was however later destroyed and only the cellar-vault and foundation walls remained. In 1653 Frederick William I, Elector of Brandenburg awarded the property of Eichmedien and the surrounding villages to Johann von Hoverbeck as a gratification for his role as Prussian ambassador to Warsaw. A palace was built on the remnants of the order's castle. In 1789 Friedrich von Redecker bought the village and it remained within the Redecker family until 1930.

References

External links

Nakomiady